Sven Davidson and Ulf Schmidt were the defending champions, but decided not to play together. Davidson partnered with Staffan Stockenberg but lost in the first round to Jean-Noël Grinda and Jean-Claude Molinari. Schmidt competed with Jan-Erik Lundqvist but lost in the first round to Roger Becker and Bob Howe.

Roy Emerson and Neale Fraser defeated Rod Laver and Bob Mark in the final, 8–6, 6–3, 14–16, 9–7 to win the gentlemen's doubles tennis title at the 1959 Wimbledon Championship.

Seeds

  Roy Emerson /  Neale Fraser (champions)
  Nicola Pietrangeli /  Orlando Sirola (semifinals)
  Barry MacKay /  Alex Olmedo (third round)
  Rod Laver /  Bob Mark (final)

Draw

Finals

Top half

Section 1

Section 2

Bottom half

Section 3

Section 4

References

External links

Men's Doubles
Wimbledon Championship by year – Men's doubles